Adelia Robertson (née Elmer; December 3, 1928 – April 19, 2022) was an American author, nurse and evangelical Christian activist. She was the wife of Christian evangelical televangelist Pat Robertson.

Biography
She was born in Columbus, Ohio, to Catholic parents, Ralph and Florence Elmer.

Elmer, a fashion model and beauty queen in the Miss Ohio State contest, was studying for her Master's in Nursing at Yale University when she met Robertson. She earned her Master's degree. She had graduated from Ohio State University-Columbus with a bachelor's degree in Social Administration.

She married Pat Robertson in 1954.

She published two books, including My God Will Supply and The New You, the latter about healthy living.

She served as secretary and member of the Board of Directors for CBN since 1960, and on the Board of Trustees at Regent University.

She was the principal US delegate to the Inter-American Commission of Women from 1982 to 1990.

References

1928 births
2022 deaths
Former Roman Catholics
American activists
American television personalities
American nurses
Regent University people
Converts to evangelical Christianity from Roman Catholicism
Ohio State University alumni
Yale University alumni
Writers from Columbus, Ohio
20th-century American women